The Sephardic Temple of Constanța also Spanish Rite Temple Israelite also  Templul Sefard din Constanța was a Sephardic synagogue  ”for the « Spanish » Jews”, located  at 18 on Mircea Street in the city of Constanța, Romania.

The  Sephardic Temple was built between 1905 and 1908 in a Catalan Gothic architectural style following the blueprints of Austrian architect Adolf Lintz and decorated by painter Moritz Finkelstein. The Temple was built in the place of an older synagogue dating from 1866, on a piece of land on Mircea
Street, a donation from Ismail Kemal Bey. The sephardic synagogue was heavily damaged during the Second World War when it was used as an ammunition warehouse, later further damaged by an earthquake, and was demolished in 1989 under the rule of Nicolae Ceaușescu.

References 

Synagogues in Romania
Synagogues completed in 1908
Buildings and structures in Constanța
Sephardi synagogues
Sephardi Jewish culture in Romania
Destroyed synagogues
Demolished buildings and structures in Romania
Buildings and structures demolished in 1989
Spanish-Jewish diaspora in Europe